Liisa Lilja (born 26 August 1992) is a Finnish paratriathlete who competes in international elite events. She is a World silver medalist, European champion and competed at the 2016 Summer Paralympics finishing in fourth place.

Lilja was diagnosed with bone cancer in her right leg when she was eight years old and her right leg got amputated above the knee when she was ten years old. She began rehabilitation by doing swimming lessons and started competing in paratriathlon internationally in 2014.

Training accident
In November 2018, Lilja was involved in a car accident in Torrevieja, Spain while on a cycling training session. She was riding downhill at 40mph and collided with a car that was on the wrong side of the road, the driver of the vehicle was convicted of drink driving when he was given a blood test. Lilja spent a few days in hospital after breaking two bones in her left leg. She was unable to train fully for three months.

References

1992 births
Living people
Sportspeople from Pori
Sportspeople from Helsinki
Finnish female triathletes
Paratriathletes of Finland
Paratriathletes at the 2016 Summer Paralympics